This is a list of fire departments in Pennsylvania organized by county.

Allegheny County 

 Aleppo Township VFC (Aleppo, Sewickley Heights), Station 101
 Allegheny County Airport Authority Fire & Rescue, Station 100
 Allegheny County HazMat
 Gold Team, Station 410
 Blue Team, Station 420
 Silver Team, Station 430
 Red Team, Station 440
 Green Team, Station 450
 Allegheny Valley VFC (Harmar, Springdale Township), Station 315
 Aspinwall VFD, Station 102
 Avalon VFD, Station 103
 Baldwin VFD
 South Baldwin VFC, Station 104
 Baldwin #1 VFD, Station 105
 Option VFD, Station 107
 Bellevue VFC, Station 108
 Bell Acres VFD, Station 307
 Ben Avon VFD, Station 109
 Bethel Park VFC, Station 110
 Blawnox VFC, Station 111
 Brackenridge VFD - Station 112
 Bradford Woods VFD - Station 115
 Brentwood VFD - Station 116
 Bridgeville Fire Department, Station 117
 Carnegie Volunteer Fire & Rescue, Station 118
 Castle Shannon Volunteer Fire Department, Station 119
 Chalfant VFD, Station 120
 Cheswick VFD, Station 121
 Churchill VFD, Station 122
 Clairton VFD, Station 123
 Cochran Hose Co VFD (Edgeworth, Glen Osborne, Sewickley), Station 258
 Collier VFD
 Kirwan Heights VFD, Station 124
 Presto VFD, Station 125
 Rennerdale VFD, Station 126
 Coraopolis VFD, Station 127
 Coulters Vol Fire & Rescue (South Versailles), Station 272
 Crafton VFD (Crafton, Thornburg, Rosslyn Farms), Station 128
 Crescent Township VFD, Station 129
 Dormont Fire Department, Station 130
 Dravosburg #1, Station 131
 Duquesne VFD, Station 133

 East Deer Volunteer Hose Company, Station 134
 Edgewood VFD, Station 137
 Elizabeth Boro VFC, Station 139
 Elizabeth Township
 Greenock VFC Co 4, Station 140-4
 Blythedale VFC, Station 140-3
 Blaine Vill VFC, Station 142
 Buena Vista VFC, Station 145
 Central VFC Co 7, Station 140-7
 Emsworth VFC, Station 148
 Etna VFD, Station 149
 Fawn VFD
 Fawn #1, Station 150
 Fawn #2, Station 151
 Imperial VFD (Findlay), Station 152
 Forest Hills VFD, Station 153
 Forward Township
 Gallatin-Sunnyside VFD, Station 154
 Forward Township VFD, Station 155
 Fox Chapel VFD, Station 157
 Franklin Park VFD, Station 158
 Frazer Township
 Frazer #1 VFD, Station 159
 Frazer #2 VFD, Station 160
 Glassport Fire Department, Station 161
 Greentree VFD, Station 163
 Hampton VFD
 Hampton Township VFD #1, Station 164
 North Hampton VFD, Station 165
 Harrison Township
 Citizen Hose #2 VFD, Station 167
 Hilltop VFD, Station 168
 Harrison Hills VFD, Station 169
 Heidelberg VFD, Station 170
 Homestead VFC, Station 171
 Indiana Township
 Dorseyville VFD, Station 172
 Middle Road VFD, Station 174
 Rural Ridge VFD, Station 175

 Jefferson Hills
 Jefferson Hills Fire & Rescue, Station 177
 Floreffe VFC, Station 178
 Gill Hall VFC, Station 179 (Idled)
 Jefferson 885 VFC, Station 180
 Kennedy Township VFD, Station 181
 Fair Oaks VFD (Fair Oaks, Leet Township), Station 308
 Leetsdale VFD, Station 309
 Liberty Boro VFD, Station 183
 Lincoln Boro VFRC, Station 184
 Marshall Township VFD, Station 185
 McCandless
 Highland VFD, Station 186
 Ingomar VFD, Station 187
 Peebles VFD, Station 188
 McDonald VFD, Station 310
 McKees Rocks VFD, Station 189
 McKeesport Fire Department, Station 190
 Millvale VFD, Station 191
 Monroeville
 Monroeville #1 VFD, Station 192
 Monroeville #3 VFD, Station 193
 Monroeville #4 VFD, Station 194
 Monroeville #5 VFD, Station 195
 Monroeville #6 VFD, Station 196
 Moon Township VFD, Station 197
 Mt. Lebanon Fire Department, Station 198
 Mt. Oliver VFD, Station 199
 Munhall
 Munhall #1 VFD, Station 200
 Munhall #2 VFD, Station 201
 Munhall #4 VFD, Station 203
 Munhall #5 VFD, Station 204
 Neville Island VFD, Station 205
 North Braddock VFD, Station 207
 North Fayette Township VFD Station 209
 North Versailles
 Crestas Terrace VFD, Station 212
 Fire Department of North Versailles, Station 213
 West Wilmerding VFD, Station 211

 Oakdale VFD, Station 215
 Oakmont VFD, Station 216
 O'Hara
 Pleasant Valley VFD, Station 217
 Parkview VFD, Station 218
 Ohio Township VFD, Station 220
 Penn Hills Fire Department
 Lincoln Park VFD, Station 221
 Rosedale VFD, Station 222
 North Bessemer VFD, Station 223
 Point Breeze VFD, Station 224
 Thad Stevens VFD, Station 225
 Penn VFD, Station 227
 Pitcairn #1 VFD, Station 229
 Pittsburgh Bureau of Fire
 Pleasant Hills VFC, Station 232
 Plum Borough
 Unity VFD, Station 233
 Renton VFD, Station 234
 Logans Ferry VFD, Station 235
 Holiday Park VFD, Station 236
 Reserve Township VFD, Station 317
 Richland Township
 Richland VFD, Station 241
 Valencia VFD, Station 242
 River's Edge VFD (Braddock, East Pittsburgh, Rankin), Station 113
 Robinson Township
 Forest Grove VFD, Station 243
 Groveton VFD, Station 244
 Moon Run VFD, Station 245
 Ross Township
 Evergreen VFD, Station 246
 Berkeley Hills VFD, Station 247
 Perrysville VFD, Station 248
 Quaill VFD, Station 249
 Fairview VFD, Station 250
 Seville VFD, Station 251
 Keating VFD, Station 252
 Laural Gardens VFD, Station 253
 Ross Township Fire Police, Station 254
 Scott Township
 Bower Hill VFD, Station 255
 East Carnegie VFD, Station 256
 Glendale Hose Co. #1, Station 257
 Shaler Township
 Bauerstown VFD, Station 259
 Cherry City VFD, Station 260
 Elfinwild VFD, Station 261
 Shaler Villa VFD, Station 262
 Sharps Hills VFD, Station 263
 Undercliff VFD, Station 264
 Sharpsburg VFD, Station 265
 South Fayette Township
 South Fayette VFD Co. 1, Station 266
 Sturgeon VFD, Station 267
 Fairview VFD, Station 268
 Oak Ridge VFD, Station 269
 South Park Township
 Broughton VFD, Station 270
 Library VFD, Station 271
 Springdale Boro VFD, Station 273
 Stowe Township VFD, Station 275
 Swissvale Boro
 Swissvale #1, Station 278-1
 Swissvale #2, Station 278-2

 Tarentum Borough
 Highland Hose Co., Station 280
 Eureka Fire Rescue, Station 281
 Summit Hose Co, Station 282
 Trafford VFD, #1, Station 311
 Turtle Creek VFD, Station 283
 Upper St. Clair VFD, Station 284
 United Vol. Fire & Rescue (Wall, E. McKeesport), Station 287
 Vigilant Hose #1 VFD (Port Vue), Station 237
 Verona VFD, Station 285
 Versailles VFD, Station 286
 West Deer Township
 West Deer #1 VFC, Station 288
 West Deer #2 VFC, Station 289
 West Deer #3 VFC, Station 290
 West Elizabeth VFD, Station 291
 West Homestead VFD, Station 292
 West Mifflin
 Homeville #1 VFD, Station 293
 Duquesne Annex #2 VFD, Station 294
 West Mifflin #3 VFD, Station 295
 Skyview #4 VFC, Station 296
 West View VFD, Station 297
 Wexford VFC, Station 228 (Pine, Wexford)
 Whitaker VFD, Station 298
 White Oak
 White Oak #1, Station 299
 Rainbow VFD, Station 300
 Whitehall VFD, Station 301
 Wilkins Township
 Wilkins #1 VFC, Station 302
 Wilkins #3 VFC, Station 303
 Wilkins #4 VFC, Station 304
 Wilmerding VFD, Station 306

Armstrong County 

 Apollo
 Apollo #2 VFD, Station 20
 Apollo #3 VFD, Station 40
 Bethel Township VFD, Station 270
 Burrell Township VFD, Station 290
 Dayton District VFD, Station 30
 Distant VFD, Station 300
 Elderton District VFD, Station 50
 Ford Cliff VFC, Station 80
 Ford City Hose Company #1, Station 90
 Freeport VFD, Station 70
 Gilpin Township VFD, Station 100
 Kiski Township VFD, Station 140
 Kittanning
 Kittanning Hose, Hook & Ladder Company #1, Station 110
 Kittanning Hose Company #4, Station 120
 Kittanning Hose Company #6, Station 130
 Kittanning Township VFD, Station 310
 Leechburg VFD, Station 150
 Manor Township VFD, Station 160
 North Apollo VFD, Station 170
 Parker City VFD, Station 180
 Parks Township VFD, Station 200
 Pine Township VFC, Station 190
 Rayburn Township VFC, Station 260
 Rural Valley Hose Company #1, Station 210
 South Buffalo Township VFC, Station 220
 Sugarcreek VFD, Station 230
 Washington Township VFD, Station 280
 West Kittanning VFD, Station 240
 West Hills Emergency Services, Station 60
 Worthington VFD, Station 250

Beaver County 

 Aliquippa Bureau of Fire, Station 91
 Ambridge Fire Department, Station 71
 Baden Fire Department, Station 47
 Beaver VFD, Station 101
 Beaver Falls VFD, Station 11
 Big Beaver VFD, Station 14
 Bridgewater, Station 28
 Brighton Township VFD, Station 63
 Center Township
 Center Township #1, Station 36
 Center Township #2, Station 37
 Center Township #3, Station 38
 Chippewa Township VFD, Station 22
 Crescent Township VFD, Station 129
 Conway VFD, Station 49
 Darlington Township VFD, Station 18
 Daugherty, Station 86
 Economy VFD, Station 69
 Ellwood City VFD, Station 103
 Enon Valley VFD, Station 12
 Fallston VFD, Station 50
 Franklin Township VFD, Station 70
 Freedom VFD, Station 27
 Hanover VFD, Station 68
 Harmony Township VFD, Station 48
 Homewood VFD, Station 19
 Hookstown VFD, Station 60
 Hopewell Township VFD, Station 92
 Independence VFD, Station 80
 Industry VFD, Station 97
 Leetsdale VFD, Station 30
 Koppel VFD, Station 17
 Midland VFD, Station 95
 Monaca
 Monaca VFD #1, Station 56
 Monaca VFD #4, Station 57
 Monaca VFD #5, Station 58
 New Brighton, Station 84
 New Galilee VFD, Station 15
 New Sewickley
 Big Knob VFD, Station 26
 Pine Run VFD, Station 59
 North Sewickley, Station 13
 Ohioville VFD, Station 39
 Patterson Heights VFD, Station 33
 Patterson Township VFC, Station 90
 Potter Township VFD, Station 34
 Pulaski Township VFD, Station 89
 Raccoon Township VFD, Station 35
 Rochester VFD, Station 23
 Shippingport VFD, Station 96
 South Beaver VFD, Station 61
 South Heights VFD, Station 45
 Vanport VFD, Station 24
 West Mayfield VFD, Station 99
 White Township, Station 44

Butler County 

 Adams Area Fire District, Station 42
 Bruin VFD, Station 29
 Buffalo Township VFC, Station 27
 Butler Bureau of Fire, Station 1
 Butler Township Fire District, Station 3
 Callery VFD, Station 19
 Chicora VFD, Station 26
 Connoquenessing VFC, Station 12
 Cranberry Township VFC, Station 21
 East Butler VFD, Station 9
 Eau Claire VFD, Station 32
 Evans City Area VFD, Station 50
 Harmony Fire District, Station 22
 Harrisville VFD, Stsation 34
 Herman VFC, Station 10
 Lick Hill VFD, Station 8
 Marion Township VFC, Station 31
 Middlesex Township VFC, Station 16
 North Washington VFD, Station 30
 Oneida Valley VFC, Station 35
 Penn Township VFD, Station 11
 Petrolia VFD, Station 28
 Portersville-Muddycreek Township VFD, Station 24
 Prospect VFD, Station 13
 Sarver VFC, Station 36
 Saxonburg VFC, Station 15
 Slippery Rock VFC, Station 33
 Unionville VFC, Station 14
 Butler VA Hospital FD, Station 38
 West Sunbury VFD, Station 25
 Winfield VFC, Station 46

Chester County 
 Berywyn, Station 2
 Paoli, Station 3
 Malvern, Station 4
 East Whiteland, Station 5
 West Whiteland, Station 6
 Keystone Valley, Station 8
 Chester County Hazardous Materials Team, Station 15
 Union Fire Co, Station 21
 West Grove, Stations 12/22/23
 Avondale, Station 23
 Kennet Square, Station 24
 Longwood, Station 25
 Cochranville, Station 27
 Sadsburyville, Station 31
 Honey Brook, Station 33
 Wagontown, Station 35
 Po-Mar-Lin, Station 36
 Modena, Station 37
 Thorndale, Station 38
 West Bradford, Station 39
 Coatesville Fire Dept, Stations 41/43
 Westwood, Station 44
 Alert of Downingtown, Station 45
 Miniquas of Downingtown, Station 46
 Lionville, Station 47
 Glen Moore, Station 48
 East Brandywine, Station 49
 First West Chester Fire, Station 51
 Good Will Fire Co, Station 52
 Fame Fire Co, Station 53
 Goshen, Stations 54/56
 Kimberton, Station 61
 Ridge Fire Co, Station 62
 Liberty Fire Co, Station 63
 Norfolk Fire Co, Station 64
 Phoenixville Hook and Ladder, Station 65
 Friendship of Phoenixville, Station 66
 West End, Station 67
 Valley Forge, Station 68
 Twin Valley, Station 69
 Ludwig’s Corner, Station 73
 International Steel, Station 75
 Chester County Dive Rescue, Station 77

Clarion County 

 Callensburg VFD, Station 510
 Clarion Fire & Hose Co.1, Station 520
 East Brady VFD, Station 530
 Farmington Township VFD, Station 540
 Foxburg, Station 550
 Hawthorn VFD, Station 560
 Knox VFC, Station 570
 Limestone VFC, Station 580
 Millcreek Twp VFD, Station 590
 New Bethlehem Fire Co.1, Station 600
 Perry Township Fire Department, Station 610
 Rimersburg Hose Co, Station 620
 Shippenville-Elk Township VFD, Station 630
 Sligo VFD, Station 640
 St. Petersburg, Station 650
 Strattanville VFD, Station 660
 Washington Township VFD, Station 670

Centre County 

 Logan Fire Company #1
 Undine Fire Company #2 (Companies #1 and #2 make up the Bellefonte Fire Department #56)
 Boalsburg Fire Company #3
 Centre Hall Fire Company #4
 Alpha Fire Company #5 (State College)
 Snow Shoe Fire Company #6
 Gregg Township Fire Company #7
 Pleasant Gap Fire Department #8
 Citizen's Hook and Ladder Company #9 (Milesburg)
 Hope Fire Company #11
 Reliance Fire Company #12 (Companies #11 and #12 make up the Phillipsburg Fire Department #57)
 Mountain Top Fire Company #13 (Sandy Ridge)
 Howard Fire Company #14
 Port Matilda Fire Company #15
 Walker Township Fire Company #16
 Pine Glen Fire Company #17
 Millheim Fire Company #18
 Miles Township Fire Company #19
 University Park Airport ARFF #20

Clinton County 

 Avis Fire Company, Station 8
 Beech Creek/Blanchard Fire Company, Station 9
 Castanea Fire Company, Station 3
 Chapman Township Fire Company, Station 27 
 Citizen's Hose Company (Lock Haven), Station 6
 Citizen's Hose Company (South Renovo), Station 28
 Dunnstown Fire Company, Station 5
 Goodwill Hose Company (Flemington), Station 7
 Haneyville Fire Company, Station 18
 Hand In Hand Hose Company (Lock Haven), Station 1
 Hope Hose Company (Lock Haven), Station 2
 Kettle Creek Hose Company, Station 26
 Lamar Township Fire Company, Station 11
 Mill Hall Fire Company, Station 4
 Nittany Valley Fire Company (Lamar), Station 17
 Renovo Fire Department, Station 29
 Sugar Valley Fire Company, Station 13
 Wayne Township Fire Company, Station 10
 Woolrich Fire Company, Station 12

Crawford County 
 	Bloomfield Township 	Fire Department
 	Blooming Valley	Fire Department
 	Cambridge Springs	Fire Department
 	Centerville 	Fire Department
 	Cherry Tree	Fire Department
 	Cochranton 	Fire Department
 	Conneaut Lake	Fire Department
 	Conneaut Lake Park	Fire Department
 	Conneautville	Fire Department
 	East Mead	Fire Department
 	Fallowfield	Fire Department
 	Greenwood	Fire Department
 	Hayfield	Fire Department
 	Hydetown	Fire Department
 	Linesville 	Fire Department
 	Meadville	Fire Department
 	North Shenango	Fire Department
 	Randolph	Fire Department
 	Saegertown	Fire Department
 	Spartansburg 	Fire Department
 	Springboro	Fire Department
 	Summit Township 	Fire Department
 	Titusville	Fire Department
 	Townville 	Fire Department
 	Venango	Fire Department
 	Vernon Central	Fire Department
 	Vernon Township	Fire Department
 	West Mead No. 1	Fire Department
 	West Mead No. 2	Fire Department

Dauphin County
 Harrisburg City
 Harrisburg Bureau of Fire
 Harrisburg River Rescue (Station 10)
 Millersburg Borough
 Millersburg Vol. Fire Company (Station 20)
 Elizabethville Borough
 Elizabethville Fire Department (Station 21)
 Lykens Borough
 Liberty Hose Company #2 (station 22)
 Wiconisco Township
 Wiconisco Vol. Fire Company (Station 23)
 Williamstown Borough
 Liberty Hose Company #1 (Station 24)
 Berrysburg Borough
 Berrysburg & Community Fire Company (Station 26)
 Gratz Borough 
 Gratz Area Fire Company (Station 27)
 Pillow Borough
 Pillow Fire Company #1 (Station 28)
 Halifax Borough
 Halifax Fire Department (Station 29)
 Pennbrook Borough
 Citizen's Fire Co. 1 of Penbrook (Station 30)
 Susquehanna Township
 Progress Vol. Fire Company (Station 32)
 Rescue Fire Company (Station 37)
 Lower Paxton Township
 Colonial Park Fire Company (Station 33)
 Paxtonia Fire Company (Station 34)
 Linglestown Fire Company (Station 35)
 West Hanover Township
 West Hanover Township Fire Company (Station 36, 36-1, & 36-2)
 Dauphin Borough
 Dauphin-Middle Paxton Fire Company (Station 38)
 East Hanover Township
 Grantville Fire Company (Station 39)
 Paxtang Borough
 Paxtang Fire Company (Station 40)
 Swatara Township
 Bressler Fire Company (Station 41)
 Rutherford Fire Company (Station 45)
 Chambers Hill Fire Company (Station 456)
 Swatara Township Volunteer Fire Company (Station 49)
 Hummelstown Borough
 Chemical Fire Company of Hummelstown (Station 46) 
 South Hanover Township
 Union Deposit Vol. Fire Company (Station 47 & 47-1)
 Derry Township
 Hershey Vol. Fire Company (Station 48)
 Steelton Borough
 Steelton Vol. Fire Department (Station 50)
 Londonderry Township
 Londonderry Fire Company (Station 54)
 Highspire Borough
 Citizen Fire Company #1 (Station 55)
 Harrisburg International Airport
 Harrisburg Internation Airport Fire Department (Station 70)
 Harrisburg Air National Guard Base
 193rd Air National Guard Fire Department (Station 71)
 Cleveland-Cliffs Steelton Steel Mill
 Cleveland-Cliffs Steelton Fire Department (Station 73)
 Three Mile Island Nuclear Generating Station
 Three Mile Island Fire Brigade (Station 74)
 Middletown Borough
 Middletown Vol. Fire Department (Station 88)

Delaware County 

 	Folcroft Fire Company
 	Norwood Fire Company
 	Clifton Heights Fire Company
 	Darby Fire Company #1
 	Glenolden Fire Company #1
 	Collingdale Fire Company #1
 Ridley Park Fire Company
 Prospect Park Fire Department
 Sharon Hill Fire Company
 Colwyn Borough Fire Company
 Morton - Rutledge Fire Company
 Eddystone Fire Company
 Swarthmore Fire and Protective Association
 Radnor Fire Company
 Yeadon Fire Company
 Folsom Fire Company
 Lansdowne Fire Company
 Aston Fire Company
 Garrettford Drexel Hill Fire Company
 Darby Fire Patrol #2
 Milbourne Fire Company
 Media Fire Hook and Ladder Company
 Highland Park Fire Company
 Llanerch Fire Company
 Brookline Fire Company
 Upper Darby Fire Company #1
 Oakmont Fire Company
 Lower Chichester Volunteer Fire Company
 Boothwyn Fire Company
 Newtown Square Fire Company
 Collingdale Fire Company # 2
 Holmes Fire Company
 Springfield Fire Company
 Parkside Fire Company
 Rocky Run Fire Company
 Chester Township Company
 Tinicum Township Fire Company
 Milmont Park Fire Company
 Middletown Fire Company No. 1
 South Media Fire Company
 Brookhaven Fire Company
 Broomall Fire Company
 Ogden Fire Company
 Manoa Fire Company
 Upland Fire Company
 Bon Air Fire Company
 Concordville Fire & Protective Association
 Reliance Hook and Ladder Company
 S. M. Vaculain Fire Company
 Green Ridge Fire Company
 Edgemont Fire Company
 Garden City Fire Company
 Bethel Township Hose Company
 Woodlyn Fire Company
 Marcus Hook Fire Company
 Leedom Fire Company
 Chester Heights Fire Company
 Rose Tree Fire Company
 Primos Secane Westbrook Park Fire Company
 Boeing Fire Department
 Chester Fire Department Station. 81
 Chester Fire Department Station. 82

Erie County 

 A.F. Dobler Hose & Ladder Company (Girard Boro, Girard Township) Station 54
 Albion VFD (Albion Boro, Conneaut Township), Station 62
 Belle Valley Fire Department, Station 36
 Brookside Fire Company, Station 24
 Corry Fire Department, Station 107
 Cranesville Fire Department, Station 60
 Crescent Hose Company #2, Station 21
 Edinboro VFD, Station 38
 Elgin-Beaverdam Dam Hose Company, Station 66
 Erie International Airport Crash-Fire-Rescue, Station 82
 Erie County HazMat, Station 80
 Erie Fire Department, Station 32
 Fairfield Hose Company, Station 26
 Fairview Fire Department
 Fairview Fire & Rescue, Station 52
 Fairview Fire Department, Station 53
 Franklin Township Fire Department, Station 72
 Fuller Hose Company No.1, Station 20
 Greenfield Township VFC, Station 70
 Harborcreek VFD, Station 22
 Kearsarge VFD, Station 44
 Kuhl Hose Company
 Kuhl Hose Company, Station 68
 Kuhl Hose Company, Station 69
 Lake City Fire Company
 Lake City Fire Company, Station 56
 Lake City Fire Company, Station 57
 Lake Shore Fire Department, Station 50
 Lawrence Park Fire Department, Station 28
 McKean Hose Company, Station 40
 Millcreek Response Team, Station 92
 Mill Village Fire Department, Station 12
 Perry Hi-Way Hose Company
 Perry Hi-Way Hose Company, Station 42
 Perry Hi-Way Hose Company, Station 43
 Platea Fire Department, Station 58
 Springfield Fire Department, Station 64
 Stancliff Hose Company, Station 14
 Union City Fire Department, Station 113
 Wattsburg Hose Company
 Wattsburg Hose Company, Station 17
 Wattsburg Hose Company, Station 18
 Wesleyville Hose Company, Station 30
 West Lake Fire Department
 West Lake Fire Department. Station 48
 West Lake Fire Department, Station 49
 West Ridge Fire Department
 West Ridge Fire Department, Station 44
 West Ridge Fire Department, Station 47

Forest County 
 Marienville Volunteer Fire Company 
 Tionesta Volunteer Fire Department
 West Hickory Volunteer Fire Department.

Huntingdon County 

 Alexandria VFD, Station 1 
 Mapleton VFC, Station 2
 Marklesburg VFC, Station 3
 Petersburg VFD, Station 4
 Mount Union VFD, Station 7
 Orbisonia-Rockhill VFC, Station 9
 Smithfield VFC, Station 10
 Shavers Creek VFC, Station 11
 Three Springs VFC, Station 12
 Shade Gap VFC, Station 14
 R.W.&BT VFC, Station 17
 Stone Creek Valley VFC, Station 19
 Mill Creek VFC, Station 20
 Trough Creek Valley VFC, Station 21
 Warriors Mark VFC, Station 22
 Huntingdon Regional Fire & Rescue, Dept 65 -Walker TWP, Station 65-1 -Huntingdon Borough, Station 65-2 -Oneida TWP, Station 65-3

Indiana County 

 Plumville VFD, Station 350

 Cherry Tree VFC, Station 520

Lackawanna County 

 Archbald Fire Department, Station 21
 Archbald Hose Company No. 1, Station 21-1
 Black Diamond Hose Company No. 2, Station 21-2
 East Side Hose Company No. 4, Station 21-3
 Blakely Hose Company, Station 22
 Carbondale City Fire Department, Station 51
 Mitchell Hose Company, Station 51-1
 Columbia Fire Company, Station 51-5
 Chinchilla Hose Company (South Abington Township) Station 2
 Clarks Summit Fire Department, Station 4
 Covington Fire Department, Station 14
 Dalton Fire Company, Station 5
 Dunmore Fire Department, Station 6
 Eagle Hose Company No. 1 (Dickson City Borough), Station 23
 Elmhurst-Roaring Brook Fire Department, Station 15
 Eynon Hose Company No. 3, Station 33
 Fleetville Fire Company (Benton Township), Station 63
 Gouldsboro Volunteer Fire Company, Station 55
 Grattan-Singer Hose Company No. 1 (Fell Township), Station 61
 Greenfield Township Volunteer Fire Company, Station 24
 Greenwood Hose Company (Moosic Borough), Station 98
 Jefferson Township Fire Department, Station 29
 Jermyn Fire Department, Station 58
 Crystal Fire Company, Station 58-1
 Artisan Fire Company, Station 58-2
 Jessup Hose Company No. 1, Station 31
 Jessup Hose Company No. 2, Station 25
 Justus Fire Company (Scott Township, Justus), Station 28
 Madisonville Fire Department (Madison Township), Station 56
 Mayfield Fire Department
 Mayfield Hose Company No. 1, Station 59-1
 Whitmore Hose Company No. 2, Station 59-2
 William Walker Hose Company, Station 59-3
 Meredith Hose Company (Carbondale Township), Station 60
 Moscow Fire and Hose Company, Station 7
 Newton/Ransom Volunteer Fire Department, Station 8
 Old Forge Fire Department, Station 93
 Old Forge Fire Company, Station 93-1
 Lawrence Hose Company, Station 93-1
 Eagle McClure Hose Company, Station 93-3
 Olyphant Fire Department, Station 26
 Excelsior Hose Company No. 1, Station 26-1
 Olyphant Hose and Engine Company No. 2, Station 26-2
 Eureka Hose Company No. 4, Station 26-4
 Liberty Hose Company No. 6, Station 26-6
 Queen City Hose Company No. 8, Station 26-8
 Scott Township Hose Company, Station 36
 Scranton Fire Department, Station 50
 Fire Headquarters
 Rescue Company No. 1
 Engine Company No. 2
 Truck Company No. 4
 Engine Company No. 7
 Engine Company No. 8
 Engine Company No. 10
 Springbrook Township Volunteer Fire Department, Station 53
 Taylor Fire Department, Station 95
 Taylor Fire Company, Station 95-1
 Taylor Fire and Rescue, Station 95-2
 Thornhurst Fire Department, Station 54
 Throop Fire Department, Station 27
 Thoop Hose Company No. 1, Station 27-1
 Throop Hose Company No. 2, Station 27-2
 Volunteer Hose Company of Throop, Station 27-3
 Whites Crossing Fire and Rescue (Carbondale Township), Station 62
 Wilson Fire Company (Blakely Borough, Peckville), Station 20

Lehigh County 
 Allentown Fire Department
 America Hook and Ladder 25/53
 Alpha Fire Company
 Altoona City Fire
 Beale Township Fire Department (Juniata County)
 Bellwood Fire Department 
 Bethlehem Fire Department 
 Benton Fire Company 
 Bernville Fire Company (Berks County)
 Bristol Consolidated Fire Department
 Bristol Fire Co. 
 Center Square Volunteer Fire Company
 Cetronia Volunteer Fire Department
 Chester Hill Hose Company (Clearfield County station 14)
 Connellsville Township Volunteer Fire Department
 Citizens Hose Company #5 (County Station #6)
 Colmar Volunteer Fire Company
 Columbia Fire Company (Clearfield County station 22)
 Croydon Fire Company 
 Dawson Volunteer Fire Department
 Delano Fire Company No. 1 
 Delaware County Firefighting 
 Dunnstown Fire Company
 Reliance Hose Company #1, Elisabethville
 Elmhurst-Roaring Brook Volunteer Fire Company
 Fire Department of Montgomery Township
 Flourtown Fire Company 
 Fort Washington Fire Company 
 Goodwill Hose Co., Bristol Borough 
 Hand-In-Hand Hose Company #1
 Harmonville Fire Company
 Harleysville Volunteer Fire Company
 Hamlin Fire and Rescue
 Hershey Fire Department
 Hope Hose Company #2, Lock Haven
 Horsham Volunteer Fire Company
 Keystone Valley Volunteer Fire Company No. 08
 Kimberton Fire Company 
 Lake Carey Volunteer Fire Company, Lemon Township, Wyoming County
 Levittown Fire Company No. 1
 Levittown Fire Company No. 2 
 Logan Township Fire
 Malvern Fire Company
 Mehoopany Vol. Fire Co.
 Minersville Fire Rescue
 Montgomery Volunteer Fire Department
 Morrisville Fire Department
 North Penn Volunteer Fire Company
 Northmoreland Township Volunteer Fire Company
 Nuremberg-Weston Volunteer Fire Company
 Old Forge Fire Department
 Pottstown Fire Department 
 Radnor Fire Company, Wayne
 Rangers Hose Company, Girardville 
 Reading Fire Department 
 Republic Volunteer Fire Company 
 Rosedale Volunteer Fire Department 
 Shanksville Volunteer Fire Department
 Scalp Level and Paint Borough Fire Company 
 Skippack Fire Company
 South Media Fire Co. 
 Springdale Volunteer Fire Department
 Union Fire Company
 Thompson Hose Company
 Tilbury Plymouth Twp 169 
 Township of Spring Volunteer Fire Rescue
 Trevose Fire Company 4, Feasterville-Trevose
 Trevose Fire Company 84
 Towamencin Volunteer Fire Company
 Union Fire Company No. 1, Oxford
 United Fire Co., Montrose
 Upper Gwynedd Fire Department
 Upper Darby Fire Department
 West Chester Fire Department
 Worcester Volunteer Fire Company

Luzerne County 
 Ashley Fire Department (St. 111)
 Avoca Fire Department (St. 112)
 Bear Creek Fire Department (St. 113)
 Shades Creek Fire Department (St. 115)
 Valley Regional Fire Department (St. 116)
 Mocanaqua Volunteer Fire Company #1 (St. 118)
 Pond Hill-Lily Lake Fire Department (St. 218)
 Courtdale Fire Department (St. 119)
 Back Mountain Regional Fire Department (St. 121)
 Kunkle Fire Department (St. 122)
 Dennison Township Fire Department (St. 123)
 Dorrance Township Volunteer Fire Department (St. 124)
 Dupont Fire Department (St. 125)
 Germania Hose Company (St. 126)
 Excelsior Hose Company (St. 226)
 Edwardsville Fire Department (St. 127)
 Exeter Township Fire Department (St. 128)
 Harding Fire Department (St. 129)
 Mt. Zion Fire Department (St. 229)
 Fairmount Township Volunteer Fire Department (St. 131)
 Mountain Top Hose Company No. 1 (St. 132)
 Fearnots Fire Department (St. 134)
 Franklin Township Fire Department (St. 135)
 Freeland Fire Department (St. 136)
 Hanover Township Fire Department (St. 137)
 Harvey's Lake Fire Department (St. 138)
 Hazleton City Fire Department (St. 139)
 Hazle Township Fire Department (St. 141)
 Harwood Fire Department (St. 241)
 Hobbie Volunteer Fire Department (St. 142)
 Hughestown Fire Department (St. 143)
 Hunlock Township Fire Department (St. 144)
 Huntington Fire Department (St. 145)
 Jackson Township Fire Department (St. 146)
 Jenkins Fire Department (St. 148)
 Kingston/Forty Fort Fire Department (St. 149)
 Trucksville Volunteer Fire Department (St. 151)
 Shavertown Volunteer Fire Company (St. 251)
 Laflin Borough Fire Department (St. 152)
 Larksville Volunteer Fire Company #1 (St. 154)
 Laurel Run Volunteer Fire Department (St. 155)
 Lake Silkworth Volunteer Fire Department (St. 256)
 Idetown Fire Department (St. 356)
 Luzerne Borough Fire Department (St. 157)
 Nanticoke City Fire Department (St. 158)
 Nescopeck Borough Volunteer Fire Department (St. 159)
 Nescopeck Township Fire Department (St. 161)
 Newport Township Fire Department (St. 163)
 Nuangola Volunteer Fire Department (St. 164)
 Pittston City Fire Department (St. 165)
 Pittston Township Fire Department (St. 166)
 Plains Township Fire Department (St. 167)
 Plymouth Borough Volunteer Fire Company #1 (St. 168)
 Goodwill Hose Company #2 (St. 168)
 Elm Hill Fire Company #3 (St. 168)
 Plymouth Township Fire Department (St. 169)
 Pringle Volunteer Fire Department (St. 171)
 Sweet Valley Volunteer Fire Company (St. 173)
 Salem Township Fire Department (St. 174)
 Shickshinny Borough Fire Department (St. 175)
 Slocum Township Volunteer Fire Company (St. 176)
 Sugarloaf Township Volunteer Fire Department (St. 177)
 Sugarnotch Volunteer Fire Department (St. 178)
 Brodericks Fire Company #2 (St. 279)
 Maltby Fire Rescue #3 (St. 379)
 West Hazleton Fire Department (St. 183)
 West Pittston Fire Department (St. 184)
 West Wyoming Fire Company #1 (St. 185)
 West Wyoming Fire Company #1 (St. 285)
 White Haven Fire Company #1 (St. 186)
 Wilkes-Barre City Fire Department (St. 187)
 Wilkes-Barre Township Fire Department (St. 188)
 Wright Township Volunteer Fire Department (St. 189)
 Wyoming Borough Fire Company #1 (St. 191)
 Wyoming Borough Fire Company #2 (St. 291)
 Yatesville Fire Department (St. 192)

Lycoming County 

 Antes Fort VFD, Station 31
 Black Forest VFC, Station 36
 Brown Township VFC, Station 35
 Citizen's Hose Co (Jersey Shore), Station 45
 Clinton Township VFC, Station 12
 Duboistown Fire Dept, Station 8
 Eldred Township VFC, Station 22
 Hepburn Township VFC, Station 15
 Hughesville VFC, Station 24
 Independent Hose Co (Jersey Shore), Station 3
 Lairdsville Community VFC, Station 27
 Loyalsock Volunteer Fire Company, Station 18
 Montgomery VFC, Station 13
 Muncy Area VFC, Station 39
 Muncy Township Vol Fire Co (Pennsdale), Station 23
 Nippenose Valley VFC, Station 6
 Nisbet VFC, Station 7
 Old Lycoming Township VFC, Station 14
 Picture Rocks VFC, Station 26
 Plunketts Creek Township VFD, Station 25
 Ralston VFC, Station 17
 South Williamsport VFD, Station 5
 Trout Run VFC, Station 16
 Unityville VFC, Station 32
 Washington Township VFC, Station 21
 Waterville Fire Dept, Station 28
 Williamsport Bureau of Fire, Station 1
 Williamsport Regional Airport, Station 19
 Willing Hand Hose Co (Montoursville), Station 20
 Woodward Township VFC, Station 2

Philadelphia County

 Philadelphia Fire Department

Sullivan County 

 Dushore VFC, Station 57
 Eagles Mere VFC, Station 51
 Endless Winds VFC, Station 55
 Eldredsville VFC, Station 56
 Forksville VFD, Station 53
 Hillsgrove VFC, Station 54
 Laporte VFC, Station 50
 Mildred VFC, Station 58
 Muncy Valley Area VFC, Station 52

Venango County 
 Cherrytree VFD, Station 2
 Clintonville VFD, Station 3
 Cooperstown VFD, Station 5
 Cornplanter VFD, Station 6
 Emlenton VFD, Station 55
 Franklin VFD, Station 9
 Kennerdell VFD, Station 30
 Oakland VFD, Station 13
 Oil City Fire Department, Station 14
 Pinegrove VFD, Station 15
 Pleasantville VFD, Station 16
 Polk Fire Rescue, Station 17
 President VFD, Station 18
 Reno VFD, Station 19
 Rockland VFD, Station 20
 Rocky Grove VFD, Station 21
 Rouseville VFD, Station 22
 Sandycreek Township VFD, Station 23
 Seneca VFD, Station 24
 Utica VFD, Station 27

Washington County 

 Amwell Township VFD, Station 34
 Avella Township VFD, Station 35
 Bentleyville VFD, Station 11
 Burgettstown VFC, Station 21
 Canton Township Fire & Rescue, Station 52
 Canonsburg VFD, Station 69
 Carroll Township VFD, Station 63
 California VFD, Station 23
 Cecil Township
 Lawrence VFC #1, Station 28
 Muse VFC #2, Station 29
 Cecil Township VFC #3, Station 10
 Charleroi Fire Department, Station 33
 Chartiers VFD, Station 25
 Claysville VFD, Station 31
 Cokeburg VFD, Station 68
 Denbo-Vista #6 VFD #6, Station 19
 Donora VFD, Station 66
 East Bethlehem VFC, Station 15
 Eldersville VFD, Station 49
 Ellsworth-Somerset VFD, Station 38
 Elrama VFC, Station 24
 Fallowfield VFD, Station 47
 Finleyville VFD, Station 26
 Hanover VFD, Station 45
 Houston VFD, Station 65
 Jefferson VFD, Station 49
 Lock #4 VFC (North Charleroi), Station 22
 Lone Pine VFD, Station 50
 Marianna VFC, Station 67
 McDonald VFD, Station 12
 Meadowlands VFD, Station 25
 Midway VFD, Station 13
 Monongahela VFD, Station 62
 Morris Township VFD, Station 42
 Mt. Pleasant VFC, Station 41
 New Eagle VFD, Station 14
 North Franklin VFC, Station 43
 North Strabane Fire Rescue, Station 48
 Peters Township VFD, Station 64
 Richeyville VFD, Station 27
 Roscoe VFD, Station 16
 Slovan-Smith Township VFD, Station 18
 South Franklin VFD, Station 52
 South Strabane VFD, Station 44
 Stockdale VFD, Station 17
 Washington City Fire Department, Station 54
 Washington County HazMat, Station 92
 Taylorstown VFD, Station 36
 West Alexander VFD, Station 39
 West Brownsville VFD, Station 61
 West Finley VFD, Station 53
 West Middletown VFD, Station 30
 Valley Inn VFD, Station 46

Westmoreland County 

 Alcoa Technical Center FD, Station 122
 Allegheny Township
 Allegheny Township VFC #1, Station 99
 Markle VFD, Station 101
 Arnold VFD, Station 95
 Avonmore VFD, Station 55
 Bell Township VFD, Station 67
 Chestnut Ridge VFD
 Delmont VFD, Station 30
 Derry Boro VFC, Station 41
 Derry Township
 Bradenville VFD, Station 71
 East Huntingdon Township VFD, Station 74
 Everson VFD, Station 60
 Fairfield Twp VFD, Station 111
 Grandview VFD, Station 106
 Greensburg VFD, Station 79
 Hose Co #1, Station 79-1
 Truck/Foam Co #2, Station 79-2
 Hose Co #3, Station 79-3
 Hose Co #6, Station 79-6
 Hose Co #7, Station 79-7
 Hose Co #8, Station 79-8
 Hempfield Township
 Adamsburg VFD, Staton 10
 Bovard VFD, Station 84
 Carbon VFD, Station 23
 Fort Allen VFD, Station 104
 Grapeville VFD, Station 21
 Hannastown VFD, Station 75
 Hempfield VFD #2, Station 29
 High Park VFD, Station 61
 Luxor VFD, Station 93
 Midway-St Clair VFD, Station 28
 North Hempfield VFD, Station 65
 West Point VFD, Station 96
 Hunker VFD, Station 27
 Hyde Park / West Leechburg VFD, Station 53
 Irwin VFD, Station 57
 Jeannette FD, Station 112
 Latrobe
 Goodwill Hose Co #1, Station 113-1
 Hook & Ladder Co #2, Station 113-2
 Freewill Hose Co #3, Station 113-3
 Good Friends Hose Co #5, Station 113-5
 Free Service Fire Unit #6, Station 113-6
 Ligonier
 Darlington VFD, Station 42
 Ligonier Volunteer Hose Co #1, Station 43
 Waterford VFD #1, Station 44
 Wilpen VFD #2, Station 45
 Lower Burrell
 Kinloch VFC #1, Station 54
 Lower Burrell VFC #3, Station 69
 Madison VFD, Station 18
 Manor VFD, Station 13
 Monessen Bureau of Fire
 Monessen #1, Station 81-1
 Monessen Hilltop #2, Station 81-2
 Mt Pleasant Boro VFD, Station 38
 Mt Pleasant Township
 Calumet VFD, Station 109
 Hecla VFD, Station 88
 Kecksburg VFD, Station 76
 Norvelt VFD, Station 37
 Trauger VFD, Station 35
 Murrysville
 Export VFD, Station 22
 Murrysville VFC #1, Station 20
 Sardis VFD, Station 78
 White Valley VFD, Station 64
 New Florence VFD, Station 46
 New Alexandria VFD, Station 77
 New Kensington Bureau of Fire, Station 56
 New Kensington #1, Station 56-1
 New Kensington #2, Station 56-2
 New Kensington #3, Station 56-3
 New Kensington #4, Station 56-4
 New Kensington #5, Station 56-5
 New Stanton VFD, Station 25
 North Belle Vernon VFD, Station 80
 North Huntingdon
 Circleville VFD, Station 8
 Fairmont-Hahntown VFD, Station 6
 Hartford Heights VFD, Station 4
 Larimer VFD, Station 1
 North Huntingdon Rescue Truck, Station 214
 Shafton VFD, Station 5
 Strawpump VFD, Station 2
 Westmoreland City VFD, Station 3
 North Irwin VFD, Station 12
 Oklahoma VFD, Station 49
 Penn Borough VFD, Station 94
 Penn Township
 Claridge VFD, Station 63
 Grandview VFD, Station 106
 Harrison City VFD, Station 87
 Level Green VFD, Station 9
 Paintertown VFD, Station 7
 Rostraver Township
 Collinsburg VFC, Station 103
 Rostraver Central VFC, Station 105
 Webster VFD #1, Station 31
 Salem Township
 Slickville VFD, Station 59
 Forbes Road VFC #2, Station 90
 Scottdale VFD, Station 58
 Seward VFD, Station 47
 Sewickley Township
 Herminie VFD, Station 15
 Hutchinson VFD, Station 85
 Lowber VFC, Station 16
 Rillton VFD, Station 14
 Smithton VFD, Station 17
 South Greensburg FD, Station 32
 South Huntingdon Township
 Turkeytown VFD, Station 107
 Yukon VFD, Staiton 19 
 Southwest Greensburg VFD, Station 24
 Sutersville VFD, Station 11
 Trafford VFD, Station 86
 Unity Townhip
 Crabtree VFD, Station 34
 Dry Ridge VFD, Station 91
 Lloydsville VFD, Station 114
 Marguerite VFD, Station 33
 Mutual VFD, Station 83
 St Vincent College VFD, Station 117
 Pleasant Unity VFD, Station 36
 Whitney Hostetter VFD, Station 73
 Youngstown VFD, Station 39
 Upper Burrell Twp FD, Station 115
 Vandergrift
 Vandergrift VFD #1, Station 51
 Vandergrift VFD #2, Station 50
 Washington Township VFC #1, Station 102
 Westinghouse Waltz Mills FD, Station 116
 Westmoreland County
 Airport Authority, Station 121
 HAZMAT Team, Station 800
 Rough Terrain Team, Station 211
 Tactical Rope Team, Station 143
 Trench Rescue Team, Station 148
 Water Rescue Team, Station 175
 West Newton VFC, Station 82
 Youngwood Hose Co #1, Station 26

See also

 List of fire departments
 List of Pennsylvania state agencies

References



 
Pennsylvania
fire departments